Christian era may refer to
the time since Christianisation in any given regional context.
Early Christianity
decline of Greco-Roman paganism
Ancient Roman Christianity
Christianization of the Germanic peoples
Christianization of the Slavs
in Christian eschatology, the age of the Church, between the age of Law and the Millennial age, see Dispensation (period)
calendar eras: Calendar era#Christian era
the Dionysian era or Common Era used in Western Christianity
Etos Kosmou (Greek Orthodoxy)
Era of the Martyrs (Diocletian era)
Incarnation Era, see Ethiopian calendar
Armenian calendar era (AD 552, year of the Monophysite schism)

See also
Post-Christian era
Ages of Man
Patriarchal age
Second Temple Judaism
Rabbinic era
Christian eschatology